was a Japanese long-distance runner. Unusually for an elite athlete, he combined training with his job as a high school teacher at Takehara Senior High School.

Unetani had a personal best for the marathon of 2.12:12 which he set in the Fukuoka Marathon in 1970. He competed in the marathon at the 1972 Summer Olympics in Munich, placing 36th. He secured his place at Munich by finishing third in the Lake Biwa Marathon, a race he had won the previous year. He is most well known for winning the 1969 Boston Marathon in a time of 2.13:49.

Unetani died from pneumonia in Wu City, Hiroshima Prefecture, on 5 November 2022, at the age of 78.

References

1944 births
2022 deaths
Japanese male long-distance runners
Universiade medalists in athletics (track and field)
Universiade gold medalists for Japan
Athletes (track and field) at the 1972 Summer Olympics
Olympic athletes of Japan
Japanese male marathon runners
Boston Marathon male winners
Nippon Sport Science University alumni
Deaths from pneumonia in Japan